Morten Skogstad (born 26 June 1962) is the drummer in the Norwegian hard rock/glam metal band Stage Dolls. He joined the band in 1993, replacing Steinar Krokstad.

Skogstad was the drummer in the Norwegian hard rock band TNT from 1988 to 1989. During his tenure in TNT, he used the stage name Kenneth Odiin.

Discography

TNT
 Intuition (1989)

Stage Dolls
Dig (1997)
Get a Life (2004)
Get a Live (2005) - live CD + bonus DVD
Always (2010)

References

Norwegian rock drummers
Male drummers
TNT (Norwegian band) members
Stage Dolls members
Living people
1962 births
Musicians from Trondheim